In most jurisdictions, prison inmates are forbidden from possessing mobile phones due to their ability to communicate with the outside world and other security issues. Mobile phones are one of the most smuggled items into prisons. They provide inmates the ability to make and receive unauthorized phone calls, send email and text messages, use social media, and follow news pertaining to their case, among other forbidden uses.

Reasons cell phones are prohibited
Security concerns are often cited for why cell-phones are prohibited in prisons.

Cellphones in prisons have been used to organize work stoppages for prison labor between prisons. Forced penal labor in the United States is a common practice.}

Cell phones in prison are used by prisoners to communicate with family and loved ones. Prisoners can be isolated, prison phone calls can be expensive, and the prisons get profits from the phone calls. The rates are controversial. Prisons have a profit motive to ban cell phones.

Methods of smuggling
Most mobile phones are smuggled in by prison staff, who often do not have to go through security as rigorously as visitors. Security of staff is often less intense because this would be time-consuming on the part of the staff, unionized prison employees are paid for this time, and it would thus increase the overall cost of operations, also, prison staff are often reluctant to diligently search their own co-workers to avoid agitating their colleagues and damaging workplace morale.

More rarely, mobile phones are smuggled in by visitors, who must undergo tougher security checks, by inmates who are granted temporary leaves of absence, or by outsiders who establish contact with inmates alongside the prison fence and/or deliver them using drones.

Once inside prison walls, the devices end up in the hands of inmates who purchase them with cash, which is also contraband in most prisons. Black market prices vary by prison, and can be up to US$1000.

Uses by prisoners
While some prisoners use their mobile devices simply for harmless communication or web browsing, others use them for illegal activity. These may include gang control, taunting witnesses, planning escapes, or arrangement of other serious crimes. Prisoners may also use smart phones to gather intelligence on prison staff and to coordinate clandestine activity within the facility.

Federal prosecutors charged five South Carolina prisoners with conning at least 442 service members out of a total of more than half a million dollars in November 2018. Two other South Carolina prisoners, John William Dobbins and Carl Richard Smith await trial for multiple scams operated using contraband cell phones out of Lee Correctional Institution, including one catfishing scam that ended in the suicide of army veteran Jared Johns.

Not all inmates use mobile phones for harmful purposes. Many inmates use them to hold innocuous conversations with family and friends. In South Carolina in September 2012, an inmate using an illegal mobile phone alerted authorities about an officer being held hostage, leading to that officer's rescue.

Combating mobile phones in prisons
Laws have been passed in various jurisdictions, placing penalties on inmates who possess mobile devices as well as staff who smuggle them in. Inmate penalties range from loss of privileges and behavior credits to additional sentencing. Staff penalties range from disciplinary action to job loss to criminal charges.

Consideration has been given to using cell phone jammers inside of prison walls to render them ineffective. The practice of jamming cell phone signals is illegal in the United States. Exceptions to this law have been considered for prisons, though there is concern that a cell phone could be a guard's lifeline in a crisis, and other rescuers may need to use them for communication.

Some places are using an experimental technology of managed communications that blocks the communications of inmates while continuing to allow that of others. This Managed Access System (MAS) technology was first deployed at Mississippi State Penitentiary in 2010 by Tecore Networks.

Special dogs have been used to sniff for cell phones coming into prison walls. Mobile phones have a unique scent, and these dogs have been trained to detect it.

One solution would be to enable the correctional facility to automatically detect and locate contraband 2G/3G/4G and WiFi mobile devices thereby enabling the facility staff to confiscate the phone and neutralize the threat completely.

An automatic 24/7 detect and locate solution such as this bypasses the weaknesses inherent to jamming (e.g., phones of facility workers can be jammed); managed access solutions (surrounding neighborhoods can be affected by the "bleed" from these systems preventing bystanders from making calls and/or not all makes of phones are subject to call intercept); and phone sniffing dogs (this solution only works when the dogs are patrolling). New solutions have been introduced to the market that provide such automated 24/7 detect and locate capabilities.

Another solution is the use of ferromagnetic cell phone detectors. This technology detects the presence of the ferrous metal components (antenna, vibrator, speaker) that are in cell phones. The reliance is then not on the location of signals, but in the recognition of the physical phone itself which cannot be masked by internalizing or hiding on the person.

In 2010, Robert Johnson, a prison guard at Lee Correctional Institution in Bishopville, South Carolina, was shot six times by a gunman hired by an inmate using a contraband cell phone. In 2013, the FCC suggested prisons be allowed to manage cell phone network access which would allow only authorized phones to access the network. However, the movement did not pass.

In February 2014, the government of Honduras enacted legislation mandating that the cellular providers in Honduras block their own signals at the nine national prisons throughout the country, in order to eliminate the extortion and kidnapping schemes that were being run by inmates within the prisons.

In 2015,  prison guards Romero Nobrega in Brazil found a cat that was used to smuggle cell phones into the prison. Four phones, four chargers and seven cards were found on it, and the prison administration carried out an unsuccessful search.

In Ireland, 648 phones were smuggled into jails in 2016, despite heightened security measures.

In 2017, it was announced that American company Securus Technologies had developed and invested more than $40 million in "Wireless Containment Solutions", which create a local cellular network inside a prison which require all phones on the network to be screened and approved.

In the UK, 20,000 mobile phones and sim cards were recovered as prison contraband in 2016. In 2017, a prison in Bristol added telephones and computers which were not connected to the internet into the prison cells in an attempt to combat illegal mobile phone usage. The UK Parliament passed a law which would allow mobile phone operators to jam cell phone signals in prisons later that year. The legislation also enabled prison officers to use devices which detect mobile phone usage.

In 2017, jails in Scotland implemented plans to block active phones within prisons through network monitoring. Between 2013 and 2017, 1,500 mobile phones or component parts were found in Scottish prisons.

References

External links
Banks, Gabrielle. "Inmates giving cell phone new meaning, use toilets to talk" (Archive). Pittsburgh Post-Gazette. June 27, 2007.

Mobile phones
Prison-related crime
Prisons